The city of Newark, New Jersey includes a large Portuguese-speaking population. Newark has been nicknamed "Little Portugal" due to its large number of Portuguese-speaking and Portuguese-descended people. Most Lusophone Americans in Newark live in the working-class neighborhood of Ironbound. In addition to immigrants from Portugal, Newark also has a large population of immigrants from Brazil and Cape Verde and to a lesser extent Angola.

History
The first Portuguese immigrants to Newark came during the early 1900s and the greatest influx of Portuguese was during the 1950s. Today there is very little immigration from Portugal. Now, most Lusophone immigrants arrive from Brazil and Portuguese-speaking Africa, especially Cape Verde. Other places of origin include Mozambique and Galicia, a region of Spain where Galician/Gallego is the spoken language also known as old-Portuguese because it is the ancestor of modern Portuguese.

Demographics
In 1995, there were 30,000 Portuguese-Americans living in Newark.

2000 Census data showed that Newark had 15,801 residents of Portuguese ancestry (5.8% of the population), while an additional 5,805 (2.1% of the total) were of Brazilian ancestry.

See also

Cape Verdean Americans
Brazilian Press
Ironbound
Gilyto
Newark Portuguese
Bissau-Guinean Americans
Portugal Day Festival in Newark

References

External links
 Portugal Day in Newark draws a big crowd

Angolan-American history
Azorean diaspora
Brazilian-American culture in New Jersey
Brazilian-American history
Cape Verdean American history
Galician diaspora
Ethnic groups in Newark, New Jersey
Mozambican diaspora
Portuguese-American culture in New Jersey
Portuguese language in the United States